Xymene warreni is a species of predatory sea snail, a marine gastropod mollusc in the family Muricidae, the rock snails or murex snails, and was first described in 1972 by Winston Ponder.

Distribution
This marine species is endemic to New Zealand.

References

 Powell A W B, New Zealand Mollusca, William Collins Publishers Ltd, Auckland, New Zealand 1979 

Gastropods of New Zealand
Gastropods described in 1972
Xymene